The Vongoda is a river in Kotlassky District of Arkhangelsk Oblast in Russia. It is a left tributary of the Northern Dvina. The area of its basin . The largest tributary of the Vongoda is the Beryozovka (right). 

The Vongoda starts in the west of Kotlassky District of Arkhangelsk Oblast, flows to the north-east and finally flows into the Northern Dvina in the north of Kotlassky District near the village of Fedotovskaya. On the left bank of the Vongoda there are the village of Molodilovskaya and many other small villages.

References 

Rivers of Arkhangelsk Oblast